djay is a digital music mixing software program for Mac OS X, Microsoft Windows, iPad, iPhone, and iPod Touch created by the German company algoriddim. It allows playback and mixing of digital audio files with a user interface that tries to simulate the concept of "two turntables and a microphone" on a computer. Before the commercial release in November 2007, djay had initially been released as freeware in June 2006. In December 2010 the software was also released for the iPad, and subsequently for iPhone and iPod Touch in March 2011.

Its interface consists of two turntables, a mixer and a music library showing songs and playlists from iTunes. It no longer supports Spotify integration.

djay for iPad received an Apple Design Award in 2011.

Features

iTunes integration
djay's iTunes integration allows the user to mix songs directly from the iTunes library. It provides the option of browsing the library, for example by Playlist, Artist, Album, Genre, Key or History. Dragging songs onto the turntables in djay, transforms them into virtual records complete with album art.

Automix
Automix mode enables djay to automatically mix songs from the iTunes library, and play them instantaneously with DJ-style transitions. Using the Automix Queue the user can step in any time and immediately queue up tracks.

Transitions
djay's instantaneous beat and tempo detection allows the user to match the BPM of two songs for a transition. On pressing the SYNC button the software automatically syncs the BPM of the two songs so that both are smoothly aligned.

Record live performance
djay allows the user record live mixes and save them in high-quality sound files. It also contains a built-in organizer arranges, previews or exports the recordings.

Multi-Touch trackpad control
Mac has a tool called the Multi-Touch trackpad. djay can dynamically utilize this trackpad to fully control the software with versatile Multi-Touch gestures. For example, a rotating gestures can adjust the EQ, while two finger swipe gesture can scratch the record and operate the crossfader.

Live sampler
There is a built-in sample pack featuring 20 high-quality sounds made by ueberschal, a company in the sampling industry. In addition, djay allows the user to create custom samples from the turntables or the microphone.

Mixer and EQ controls
djay consists of a 3-band equalizers, gain, line faders, and a crossfader that provide the user with the necessary tools needed for a DJ setup to seamlessly blend one song into another.

Harmonic Match
The software can automatically detect a song's key and matches it to songs of the same key within the iTunes music library. It also allows the user to transpose songs into different keys, and even sort the entire music library by key.

High-quality audio FX
djay includes three FX control panes for different mixing styles: a one-touch panel for instant FX, a custom pane, and a 2D touch interface. Effects include Flanger, Phaser, Echo, Gate, Bit Crusher, Filter (High Pass, Low Pass), as well as six preconfigured instant effects: Absorb, Drift, Sway, Crush, Punch, Twist are bundled in with djay.

Beat-matched looping & cue points
djay has a range of different looping styles: Auto, Manual and Bounce. The use can manually set loop in and out points, use Auto-Loop to continuously loop part of a song, or remix live using Bounce-Loop to mash up the song, all in perfect sync with the beat.

iCloud integration
The program can work with iCloud (and iTunes Match), meaning the user can sync it with the iTunes library in the cloud. In other words, tunes are synced between every iOS device connected on the cloud. All of these devices can run djay, and cues and BPM information edited or added in will appear immediately in all of the others. There is a remote control available for iOS to control the djay app on the MacBook over WiFi.

Pre-cueing
djay allows the user to preview and prepare the next song through headphones before playing it on the main speakers by simply connecting a USB audio interface or splitter cable. The software offers different audio hardware configurations.

Live microphone
djay allows the user to add live microphone input into the mix. Using Echo or Pitch-Changer effects once can transform vocals for an appropriate MC performance.

MIDI controllers
djay supports controllers such as Vestax, Numark and other manufacturers. In addition, djay features a MIDI learn system allowing users to configure and map any controller to their preference.

See also
DJ
Deejay (Jamaican)
iTunes

References

External links
Official djay for Mac website
Official djay for iPad website
Official djay for iPhone website
Official djay for Microsoft Windows

MacOS software
Windows software
DJ software
Audio mixing software